Highland Avenue, east of the BeltLine North Highland Avenue, is a major thoroughfare in northeast Atlanta, forming a major business corridor connecting five Intown neighborhoods:
Highland Avenue begins at Central Park Place NE in the Old Fourth Ward and proceeds eastward past the Atlanta Medical Center and crossing Freedom Parkway a first time. 
It crosses the BeltLine where it becomes North Highland Avenue NE and forms the main retail and entertainment street of Inman Park. 
North Highland Avenue then bends north and crosses Freedom Parkway again, entering the Poncey-Highland neighborhood which takes part of its name from the avenue. 
It then crosses Ponce de Leon Avenue, entering Virginia-Highland, the second neighborhood to take part of its name from the avenue. 
Crossing Amsterdam Ave., North Highland Ave. enters Morningside/Lenox Park, then ends at the intersection with Johnson Road.

Business districts
The North Highland corridor connects multiple small business districts within each neighborhood in Morningside, Virginia-Highland, Poncey Highland, Inman Park and the Old Fourth Ward. Local businesses market the corridor as the "Highland Corridor".

Events
The same Highland corridor is the focus of one of the annual Atlanta Streets Alive pedestrian and cycling events.

Traffic
North Highland Avenue is the focus of a traffic and pedestrian study by the City of Atlanta.

References

External links
"North Highland Avenue at the BeltLine", photos of transformation
"Flashback Fotos: Journey Down Highland Avenue", Atlanta Journal-Constitution site - online gallery of historic photos of North Highland Avenue

Roads in Atlanta
Transportation in Fulton County, Georgia
Virginia-Highland
Old Fourth Ward